Trond Nordseth (born 5 January 1974) is a retired Norwegian football striker; late in his career defender.

He grew up in the club Sparbu and represented Norway as a youth international. Ahead of the 1993 season he was picked up by Steinkjer FK. Ahead of the 1997 season he was pronounced captain.

Ahead of the 1998 season he trialled with Rosenborg, Molde and Aalesund, but joined Byåsen. He scored 12 league goals, and was bought by Start where he managed the same feat in 1999. Start won promotion, and in the 2000 Eliteserien Nordseth played 23 games. He went on to Romerike in 2002, then Steinkjer in mid-2002, Byåsen again in 2005 and Levanger in 2007. In the spring of 2008 he started another season for Levanger, but then moved to Kristiansand to work in advertising and quit his career.

References

1974 births
Living people
People from Steinkjer
Norwegian footballers
Steinkjer FK players
Byåsen Toppfotball players
IK Start players
Skjetten SK players
Levanger FK players
Norwegian First Division players
Eliteserien players
Association football forwards
Association football defenders
Norway youth international footballers
Sportspeople from Trøndelag